Robert L. Blackman (July 7, 1918 – March 18, 2000) was an American football player and coach.  He served as the head football coach at the University of Denver (1953–1954), Dartmouth College (1955–1970), the University of Illinois at Urbana–Champaign (1971–1976), and Cornell University (1977–1982), compiling a career college football record of 168–112–7.  He was inducted into the College Football Hall of Fame as a coach in 1987.

Early years and playing career
Blackman was born in De Soto, Iowa on July 7, 1918.  He played football at the University of Southern California, beginning in 1937.  Blackman was named a captain of the freshmen team, but stopped playing after being stricken with polio.  He was named an assistant coach at USC while still an undergraduate student.

Coaching career
After head coaching stints at the San Diego Naval Academy, Pasadena City College, and the University of Denver, Blackman was named head coach at Dartmouth College in 1955, where he was universally known among players and students alike as "The Bullet."  In 16 seasons under Blackman, Dartmouth had a record of 104–37–3, including undefeated seasons in 1962, 1965, and 1970 while leading Dartmouth to their first conference title in 60 years in 1958. They would win it six more times in his tenure, including his final season in 1970. In his final season at Dartmouth, Blackman received the Walter Camp Coach of the Year Award.

In 1971, Blackman became the head coach at the University of Illinois at Urbana-Champaign.  In six seasons with the Fighting Illini, Blackman had a record of 29–36–1.  Blackman returned to the Ivy League in 1977, where he replaced George Seifert as head coach of the Cornell University Big Red until 1982.

Later years and death
Blackman retired to Hilton Head, South Carolina and died on March 18, 2000, in Burlingame, California.

Head coaching record

See also
 List of presidents of the American Football Coaches Association

References

External links
 

1918 births
2000 deaths
Cornell Big Red football coaches
Dartmouth Big Green football coaches
Denver Pioneers football coaches
Illinois Fighting Illini football coaches
USC Trojans football players
USC Trojans football coaches
Pasadena City Lancers football coaches
College Football Hall of Fame inductees
People from Dallas County, Iowa
People with polio